Tephritis postica is a species of tephritid or fruit flies in the genus Tephritis of the family Tephritidae.

Distribution
France, Central Europe & Ukraine South to North Africa, Israel & Iran.

References

Tephritinae
Insects described in 1844
Diptera of Asia
Diptera of Europe